Gana Mukti Sangram, Asom (Assamese:গণ মুক্তি সংগ্ৰাম, অসম) was a regional Indian political party of Assam, founded on 20 March 2015, at Moranhat, Assam. This was announced by activist Akhil Gogoi after a speech by Gandhian leader Anna Hazare at the 4th 2-yearly conference of Krishak Mukti Sangram Samiti (KMSS). "The party aims at changing the capitalist system of India" said Gogoi.

In 2017, during the 5th bi-annual Conference of Krishak Mukti Sangram Samiti, Akhil Gogoi announced that the party would contest in the next elections.

In 2020, Gana Mukti Sangram Asom merged wth Raijor Dal.

References 

Political parties in Assam
Political parties established in 2015
2015 establishments in Assam